Burton Agnes Manor House is an English Heritage property, located in the village of Burton Agnes, East Riding of Yorkshire, England only a few yards away from the newer Burton Agnes Hall. 

It is a surviving example of a Norman manor house with a well-preserved Norman undercroft, and was encased in 18th-century brickwork. It is now a Grade I listed building.

It is open to the public from 11 am to 5 pm from April to October.

History
The manor house was built between 1170 and 1180 by Roger de Stuteville, The manor house and village were named after his daughter.  Both passed by marriage into the hands of the Somerville family in 1274 and then by marriage to the Griffith family . A descendant, Sir Walter Griffith, is believed to have restored the hall and added the present roof in the 15th century.

In 1654 the estate passed from Sir Henry Griffith to his nephew Sir Francis Boynton, and still remains in the ownership of the Boynton family.

References

External links

 

Country houses in the East Riding of Yorkshire
Grade I listed buildings in the East Riding of Yorkshire
English Heritage sites in the East Riding of Yorkshire
Grade I listed houses